Hart House may refer to:

 Harthouse, a record label

in Canada
 Hart House (Alberta), historic house of the Hart wrestling family
 Hart House (University of Toronto), a student centre

in the United States
Wilson A. Hart House, La Junta, Colorado, listed on the National Register of Historic Places (NRHP) in Otero County, Colorado
Gen. William Hart House, Old Saybrook, Connecticut, listed on the NRHP in Middlesex County, Connecticut]
Timothy Hart House, Southington, Connecticut, listed on the NRHP in Hartford County, Connecticut
Hart House (Taylor's Bridge, Delaware), listed on the NRHP in New Castle County, Delaware
Bullard-Hart House, Columbus, Georgia, listed on the NRHP in Muscogee County, Georgia
Big John Hart House, Yazoo City, Mississippi, listed on the NRHP in Yazoo County, Mississippi
Charles Walter Hart House, Charles City, Iowa, listed on the NRHP in Floyd County, Iowa
F. H. Hart House, Beloit, Kansas, listed on the NRHP in Mitchell County, Kansas 
John Hart House (Elizabethtown, Kentucky), listed on the NRHP in Hardin County, Kentucky 
J. Hawkins Hart House, Henderson, Kentucky, listed on the NRHP in Henderson County, Kentucky 
Gen. Thomas Hart House, Winchester, Kentucky, listed on the NRHP in Clark County, Kentucky
Hart House (Baton Rouge, Louisiana), listed on the NRHP in East Baton Rouge Parish, Louisiana
Hart House (New Orleans, Louisiana), listed on the NRHP in Orleans Parish, Louisiana
Hart House (Lynnfield, Massachusetts), listed on the NRHP in Essex County, Massachusetts
Rodney G. Hart House, Lapeer, Michigan, listed on the NRHP in Lapeer County, Michigan
Lovira Hart, Jr., and Esther Maria Parker Farm, Tuscola, Michigan, listed on the NRHP in Tuscola County, Michigan
Jeremiah Hart House, Portsmouth, New Hampshire, listed on the NRHP in Rockingham County, New Hampshire
Phoebe Hart House, Portsmouth, New Hampshire, listed on the NRHP in Rockingham County, New Hampshire
John Hart House (Portsmouth, New Hampshire), listed on the NRHP in Rockingham County, New Hampshire
Hart-Rice House, Portsmouth, New Hampshire, listed on the NRHP in Rockingham County, New Hampshire
John D. Hart House, Pennington, New Jersey, listed on the NRHP in Mercer County, New Jersey
Hart-Hoch House, Pennington, New Jersey, listed on the NRHP in Mercer County, New Jersey 
Hart House (Burlingham, New York), listed on the NRHP in Sullivan County, New York
Hart-Cluett Mansion, Troy, New York, listed on the NRHP in Rensselaer County, New York
Eleazer Hart House, Yonkers, New York, listed on the NRHP in Westchester County, New York
Dr. Franklin Hart Farm, Drake, North Carolina, listed on the NRHP in Nash County, North Carolina 
J. Deryl Hart House, Durham, North Carolina
Maurice Hart House, Stovall, North Carolina, listed on the NRHP in Granville County, North Carolina 
Gideon Hart House, Westerville, Ohio, listed on the NRHP in Franklin County, Ohio
Lucy Hart House, Worthington, Ohio, listed on the NRHP in Franklin County, Ohio 
Moses and Mary Hart Stone House and Ranch Complex, Westfall, Oregon, listed on the NRHP in Malheur County, Oregon
John L. Hart House (Hartsville, South Carolina), listed on the NRHP in Darlington County, South Carolina
Thomas E. Hart House, and Kalmia Gardens, Hartsville, South Carolina, listed on the NRHP in Darlington County, South Carolina
John L. Hart House (Springville, South Carolina), listed on the NRHP in Darlington County, South Carolina
Hart House (York, South Carolina), listed on the NRHP in York County, South Carolina
Meredith Hart House, Rio Vista, Texas, listed on the NRHP in Johnson County, Texas
Thomas B. Hart House, Wauwatosa, Wisconsin, listed on the NRHP in Milwaukee County, Wisconsin

See also
John Hart House (disambiguation)
Hart Building (disambiguation)